Order of Excellence may refer to one of the following:

Alberta Order of Excellence
Order of Excellence (Bahamas)
Order of Excellence (Jamaica)
Order of Excellence of Guyana